Agustín Masaña (born 7 July 1946) is a Spanish field hockey player. He competed at the 1968 Summer Olympics and the 1976 Summer Olympics.

References

External links
 

1946 births
Living people
Spanish male field hockey players
Olympic field hockey players of Spain
Field hockey players at the 1968 Summer Olympics
Field hockey players at the 1976 Summer Olympics
Field hockey players from Barcelona